Wangfujing is a shopping street in Beijing, China, located in Dongcheng District. The majority of the main area is pedestrianised. Since the middle of the Ming Dynasty there have been commercial activities in the area. In the Qing Dynasty, ten aristocratic estates and princess residence were built here, soon after when a well full of sweet water was discovered, thereby giving the street its name "Wang Fu" (princely residence), "Jing" (well). Many exotic foods are served on Wangfujing snack street.

Location
The street starts from Wangfujing Nankou ("south entrance"), where the Oriental Plaza, Beijing Hotel, and Wangfujing Subway Station are located. The street then heads north, passing the Wangfujing Xinhua Bookstore, the Beijing Department Store as well as the Beijing Foreign Languages Bookstore before ending at the Sun Dong An Plaza and St. Joseph's Catholic Church.

History
The street was also previously known as Morrison Street in English, after the Australian journalist George Ernest Morrison. Wangfujing is also one of the traditional downtown areas of Beijing, along with Liulichang.

Until the late 1990s, the street was open to traffic.  Modifications in 1999 and 2000 made much of Wangfujing Street pedestrian only (aside from the tour trolley). Now through traffic detours to the east of the street.

The 2011 Chinese pro-democracy protests were planned to take place in Wangfujing. Some violence occurred there between police and foreign journalists.

Stores
Wangfujing is now home to around 280 shops. Wangfujing malls include the Beijing Department Store, Beijing apm, Beijing Mall and The Malls at Oriental Plaza, WF CENTRAL.

Food and snacks
Wangfujing snack street, located in hutongs just west of the main street, contains many restaurants and street food stalls. The food stalls serve a variety of common and exotic street food, including chuanr (meat kebabs, commonly made of lamb) and desserts, such as tanghulu or candied fruits on a stick.

Transport 
The Wangfujing Station of Beijing Subway Line 1 is located at the intersection of Wangfujing Street and Chang'an Avenue.

See also

 Beijing central business district
 List of leading shopping streets and districts by city

References

External links 

 Old brands of Beijing  
 Wangfujing Website

Dongcheng District, Beijing
Neighbourhoods of Beijing
Pedestrian malls in China
Shopping districts and streets in China
Streets in Beijing
Tourist attractions in Beijing